In My Life: Greatest Hits is a compilation album by American recording R&B singer Stephanie Mills released in 1985. It is Mills first greatest hits album which features her hit charting songs, "What Cha' Gonna Do With My Lovin'", Never Knew Love Like This Before", and the top five R&B hits "Two Hearts" a duet with Teddy Pendergrass and "Sweet Sensation".

Track listing

Personnel
Producer – David "Hawk" Wolinski (tracks: 1, 6)
James Mtume (tracks: 2 to 5, 7, 8)
Reggie Lucas (tracks: 2 to 5, 7, 8) 

Tracks & Credits from original liner notes

References

External links
"In My Life: Greatest Hits" - Amazon

1987 compilation albums
Stephanie Mills compilation albums
Casablanca Records compilation albums
Funk compilation albums